And Now a Word From Our Sponsor is a 2013 Canadian comedy-drama film directed by Zack Bernbaum.  It stars Bruce Greenwood, Parker Posey, Allie MacDonald, Rhys Ward.  Greenwood plays a burnt-out ad man who can only speak in product catch phrases.

Premise 
Advertising executive Adan Kundle wakes up in a hospital, able to speak only in product slogans.  When Adan requires a place to stay, a volunteer at the hospital, Karen Hillridge, offers to let him stay at her house, much to her daughter Meghan's dismay.  As Adan helps Karen and Meghan resolve their differences, rival executive Lucas Foster attempts to oust Adan from the advertising firm.

Cast

Release 
And Now a Word from Our Sponsor premiered on April 27, 2013, at the Newport Beach Film Festival.  It was released to video on demand on May 6 and in US theaters on May 10, 2013.

Reception 
Rotten Tomatoes, a review aggregator, reports that 11% of nine surveyed critics gave the film a positive review; the average rating is 4.6/10.  Metacritic rated it 33/100 based on 10 reviews.  Peter Debruge of Variety called it a "well-cast but seldom funny satire" that misses an opportunity at social commentary.  Frank Scheck of The Hollywood Reporter wrote, "Despite appealing performances, this comedy suffers from its derivative premise."  Stephen Holden of The New York Times called it "a feeble, lazy descendant of Being There".  Gary Goldstein of the Los Angeles Times described it as "a thoroughly engaging lark" that is saved by the cast.  Mike D'Angelo of The A.V. Club gave it a letter grade of "C" and wrote, "[Greenwood] can't rescue the movie all by himself, but he does at least transform it into a first-rate acting class."

References

External links 
 
 Interview with Zack Bernbaum at Adweek

2013 films
2013 comedy-drama films
Canadian comedy-drama films
Canadian independent films
Canadian satirical films
English-language Canadian films
Films about advertising
2013 independent films
2010s satirical films
2010s English-language films
2010s Canadian films